Frederick Wood may refer to:
Freddy Wood, English football player who played as a goalkeeper
Frederick Wood (surveyor) (1807–1893), English surveyor and land agent
Frederick Wood (historian) (1903–1989), New Zealand historian and university professor
Frederick Wood (industrialist) (1926–2003), businessman and industrialist
Frederick Charles Wood, American serial killer 
Fred Thomas Wood, Chilean footballer

See also
 Frederick Woods (disambiguation)